Katrin und die Welt der Tiere is a German television series.

See also
List of German television series

External links
 

2009 German television series debuts
2010 German television series endings
Television series about animals
German children's television series
German-language television shows